Lloyd Cameron Russell-Moyle  (born 14 September 1986) is a British Labour and Co-operative Party  politician who was elected as the Member of Parliament (MP) for Brighton Kemptown in the 2017 general election. He retained his seat in the 2019 general election. He is a member of the left-wing Socialist Campaign Group parliamentary caucus.

Early life and education 
Russell-Moyle was born on 14 September 1986 in Brighton, England. He was educated at Wallands Primary School, Priory School, Lewes, and Sussex Downs College. He studied at the University of Bradford and the University of Sussex.

Russell-Moyle worked at the National Youth Agency, chairing The Woodcraft Folk and as vice-president of the European Youth Forum based in Brussels.

Political career 

Russell-Moyle stood in the 2015 general election for the Lewes constituency, coming fourth. He was elected and served as a councillor on Brighton and Hove City Council in August 2016, before standing for and being elected as MP for Brighton Kemptown in 2017.

In May 2018 Russell-Moyle as the Chair of the All-Party Parliamentary Group on Youth Affairs launched an inquiry into "the Role and Sufficiency of Youth Work". In the recommendations published in October 2018 Russell-Moyle highlighted the relevance and importance of the inquiry stating, "Over the years youth work has borne the brunt of significant spending cuts. Recent events and reports suggest the loss of youth work has had a negative impact on young people and communities".

On 10 December 2018, Russell-Moyle was suspended from the House of Commons for the remainder of the day's sitting after he seized the ceremonial mace in protest at the government's eleventh-hour deferral of the vote on the EU Withdrawal Agreement, which had been scheduled for the following day.

On 5 March 2019, Russell-Moyle joined thirteen other Labour MPs on Westminster Bridge, next to the Houses of Parliament, in a protest against Brexit under the banner 'Love Socialism Hate Brexit'. Russell-Moyle was one of a number of MPs to light red flares on the bridge. The use of flares so close to Westminster drew the attention of uniformed police, who arrived by boat to inquire what was taking place.

During Prime Minister's Questions, on 20 March 2019, Russell-Moyle urged Prime Minister Theresa May to "condemn" Andrea Leadsom for the Cabinet Minister's comments on LGBT education. Leadsom had made comments on radio that parents should decide when their children are "exposed" to LGBT education. Leadsom's comments drew anger from many who felt, in Russell-Moyle's words, that "This is Conservative Party dog-whistle politics". Russell-Moyle also criticised the Prime Minister, stating that she had "campaigned to keep Section 28" which prevented the "promotion of homosexuality", which Russell-Moyle said had "led to millions of young people like myself growing in fear of being LGBT".

Russell-Moyle was involved in a physical altercation on 21 March 2019 whilst out showing support for demonstrators leafleting for 'The People's March', a demonstration in support of the People's Vote campaign. Russell-Moyle described how an individual first began arguing with an ITV News crew suggesting that they were part of a "mainstream media conspiracy to stop Brexit". Russell-Moyle then approached the scene and said that he was an MP and that "the majority of [his] constituents had voted Remain". He said that this information exacerbated the situation further with the individual describing MPs as "traitors" and lunging at him. The incident took place less than 24 hours after Prime Minister Theresa May gave a speech on Brexit in which she blamed MPs for deliberately delaying her attempt to ensure the UK left the EU by 29 March.

In June 2019, Russell-Moyle was criticised by the Board of Deputies for hosting a Stop the War coalition meeting in Parliament to which a representative of the Yemeni Houthi group, Ahmed Alshami, had been invited. The Board's Vice President stated that "hosting an organisation in the Houses of Parliament whose official slogan includes the phrase ‘death to Israel, curse the Jews’ is utterly unacceptable. Lloyd Russell-Moyle should immediately disavow his support for this event". Russell-Moyle described Alshami as "part of the delegation to the UN process...I support efforts to bring peace to Yemen, encouraging dialogue with people on all sides, however much I disagree with Mr Alshami [sic] views". Russell-Moyle later made his offer to host the meeting conditional on the non-participation of Alshami.

On 12 December 2019, Russell-Moyle was re-elected as a Labour MP to his Brighton Kemptown constituency. His speech on the night, which included an undertaking to "fight [the Tories] in ...the Parliament...the courts...the workplaces...the streets", aroused comment in the press and on social media. In December 2019, Russell-Moyle sparked controversy when he said he was not a "cunt" in refusing to call for Corbyn to resign, during an exchange on instant messenger with a former party member, which was leaked to The Sun.

Russell-Moyle was appointed Shadow Foreign Minister in January 2020, holding the brief for the Americas and Caribbean, East Asia and the Pacific and the Overseas Territories. Upon the election of Keir Starmer as party leader, he was appointed as Shadow Minister for Natural Environment and Air Quality.

In April 2020, Russell-Moyle was reported to have shared an unredacted version of a Labour Party dossier into the handling of antisemitism, which contained the names and details of whistle-blowers.

In June 2020, he issued an apology after writing an article for Tribune in which he accused J. K. Rowling of using her experience of domestic abuse and sexual assault to justify discrimination against transgender people.

On 16 July 2020, Russell-Moyle resigned from his frontbench role, citing a "campaign by the right-wing media" which he believes led to him and his staff receiving targeted abuse.

In January 2023, Russell-Moyle reacted angrily to a speech by Miriam Cates in a debate on the Gender Recognition Reform (Scotland) Bill., branding her as 'transphobic' and saying she 'should be ashamed'. He later apologised to Dame Rosie Winterton and to Cates for the tone of his response. Rosie Duffield accused Russell-Moyle of crossing the floor to sit next to Cates in order to intimidate her, after having heckled several speakers. Conservative MP Paul Bristow confirmed the report and said he moved closer to Cates in response to Russell-Moyle's behaviour.

Select Committees and All Party Parliamentary Groups
Russell-Moyle is Chair of the All-Party Parliamentary Group on Youth Affairs. Russell-Moyle is also listed as Chair of the All-Party Parliamentary Group on Kurdistan in Turkey and Syria, which replaced his Chairmanship of the All-Party Parliamentary Group for Kurds in Iran; All-Party Parliamentary Group for Rojava (Democratic Federation of Northern Syria) and Vice Chairmanship of Kurds in Turkey in the 2017–2019 Parliament.

Russell-Moyle is listed as Treasurer of All-Party Parliamentary Groups on HIV/AIDS and on Universities and he is listed as Vice Chair or Officer of the All-Party Parliamentary Groups on The Bahá'í Faith; Council Housing; Deaths Abroad, Consular Services and Assistance;  Housing Market and Housing Delivery; Sixth Form Education and Vaccinations for All.

During the 2017–2019 Parliament Russell-Moyle was a member of following Parliamentary committees:

 International Development Committee
 Committees on Arms Export Controls, formerly Quadripartite Committee
 International Development Sub-Committee on the Work of the Independent Commission for Aid Impact
 Draft Registration of Overseas Entities Bill (joint)
 Voyeurism (Offences) (No. 2) Bill
 Prisons (Interference with Wireless Telegraphy) Bill
 Courts and Tribunals (Judiciary and Functions of Staff) Bill [Lords]
 National Insurance Contributions (Termination Awards and Sporting Testimonials) Bill
 Civil Liability Bill [Lords]
 Courts and Tribunals (Online Procedure) Bill [Lords]

In the 2019 Parliament Russell-Moyle has been member of the following Parliamentary committees:
 Public Administration and Constitutional Affairs Select Committee
 International Trade Select Committee
 Committees on Arms Export Controls, formerly Quadripartite Committee

Russell-Moyle is an honorary associate of the National Secular Society.

Personal life 
In November 2018, during a House of Commons debate to mark the 30th World AIDS Day, Russell-Moyle revealed he had been diagnosed as HIV positive a decade earlier, saying he wanted to tackle the stigma still associated with the condition and stating: "I have not only survived, I've prospered, and any partner I have is safe and protected", making reference later in his speech to having an undetectable viral load, as well as discussing pre-exposure prophylaxis and public health policy. In disclosing his HIV status in a Parliamentary speech, he became the first MP to do so in the chamber of the House of Commons and only the second person (after Chris Smith) to live openly with HIV as an MP.

References

External links

 
 
 

1986 births
Alumni of the University of Bradford
Alumni of the University of Sussex
Gay politicians
English LGBT politicians
LGBT members of the Parliament of the United Kingdom
Living people
People educated at Priory School, Lewes
People educated at East Sussex College
People from Brighton
Councillors in East Sussex
Labour Party (UK) councillors
Labour Co-operative MPs for English constituencies
UK MPs 2017–2019
UK MPs 2019–present
People associated with the Woodcraft Folk
People with HIV/AIDS
English socialists
Politicians from Brighton and Hove